The Little Black River is a stream in Ripley and Butler counties in southeast Missouri and Clay and Randolph counties of northeast Arkansas. It is a tributary to the Current River.

The stream flows south for about 2.5 miles and turns southwest re-entering Ripley County. It flows through the southeast corner of Ripley County and crosses the Missouri-Arkansas border one mile west of the community of Sinsabaugh, Missouri. 

Within Arkansas the stream flows south in Clay County passing under Arkansas Highway 211 on the west side of Success. It flows to the southwest to enter the Current River on the Clay-Randolph county line 2.5 miles northwest of the community of Datto and five miles south of the Missouri-Arkansas state line.

References

Rivers of Arkansas
Rivers of Missouri
Bodies of water of Clay County, Arkansas
Rivers of Randolph County, Arkansas
Rivers of Butler County, Missouri
Rivers of Ripley County, Missouri